This article shows all participating team squads at the 2020 Men's European Water Polo Championship.

Ages, caps and clubs are as of 14 January 2020.

Group A

Croatia
Head coach: Ivica Tucak

Germany
Head coach: Hagen Stamm

Montenegro
Head coach: Vladimir Gojković

Slovakia
Head coach: Peter Nižný

Group B

Netherlands
Head coach: Harry van der Meer

Romania
Head coach:  Athanasios Kechagias

Russia
Head coach: Sergey Yevstigneyev

Serbia
Head coach: Dejan Savić

Group C

Hungary
Head coach: Tamás Märcz

Malta
Head coach: Karl Izzo

Spain
Head coach: David Martín

Turkey
Head coach: Sinan Turunç

Group D

France
Head coach:  Nenad Vukanić

Georgia
Head coach: Revaz Chomakhidze

Greece
Head coach: Thodoris Vlachos

Italy
Head coach: Alessandro Campagna

Abbreviations
GK: Goalkeeper; AR: All-Round; DF: Defender; CB: Centre-back; D: Driver; W: Wing; CF: Centre-forward; C: Captain

Statistics

Player representation by league system
In all, European  Championship squad members play for clubs in 16 different countries.

Most represented clubs

References

External links
Official website
Official LEN website

Men
Men's European Water Polo Championship
European Water Polo Championship squads